Holman is an unincorporated community located in Mora County, New Mexico, United States. Holman has a post office with ZIP code 87723, which opened on September 17, 1894. Holman was settled in 1816.

References

Unincorporated communities in Mora County, New Mexico
Unincorporated communities in New Mexico